is a Japanese manga series written and illustrated by Akihiko Higuchi. It has been serialized in Kodansha's Shōnen Magazine Edge since June 2019, with its chapters collected into six tankōbon volumes as of June 2022. An anime television series adaptation by C2C will premiere in April 2023.

Characters

Media

Manga
Written and illustrated by Akihiko Higuchi, Otaku Elf began serialization in Kodansha's Shōnen Magazine Edge on June 17, 2019. As of June 2022, six tankōbon volumes have been published. In North America, Seven Seas Entertainment has licensed the series in print and digital formats.

Volume list

Anime
An anime television series adaptation was announced in June 2022. It will be produced by C2C and directed by Takebumi Anzai, with scripts written by Shōgo Yasukawa, character designs handled by Takeshi Oda, who will also serve as chief animation director, and music composed by Akito Matsuda. It will premiere on April 8, 2023, on the Animeism programming block on MBS and other affiliates. The opening theme song, is performed by Akari Nanawo, while the ending theme song, is performed by Cody Lee. Sentai Filmworks licensed the series, and will be streaming it on Hidive.

References

External links
  
  
 

Anime series based on manga
Animeism
C2C (studio)
Comedy anime and manga
Elves in popular culture
Fantasy anime and manga
Kodansha manga
Nikkatsu
Sentai Filmworks
Seven Seas Entertainment titles
Shōnen manga
Upcoming anime television series